Paul Lauritz (18  April 1889 - 31  October 1975) was a Norwegian-born American oil painter and art teacher.

Biography

Paul Lauritzen was born at Larvik, Norway.
He was the son of  Lauritz Olsen and his wife Maren Sofie. He first moved to Vancouver, Canada at age 16 to live with relatives. He worked his way west as a commercial artist in Vancouver and Portland  before moving to Alaska during the Gold Rush.
In 1919, he moved to Los Angeles and opened a studio at the Lyceum Theatre.
 Besides painting, he also taught at the Chouinard Art Institute and the Otis Art Institute, and he was the president of the California Art Club.

His work is in the permanent collections of the Crocker Art Museum and the Los Angeles County Museum of Art.
He is represented at The Irvine Museum, San Diego Museum of Art and Carnegie Art Museum (Oxnard, California).

References

1889 births
1975 deaths
Artists from Los Angeles
Norwegian emigrants to the United States
Otis College of Art and Design faculty
People from Larvik
19th-century Norwegian painters
19th-century male artists
20th-century Norwegian painters
19th-century American painters
20th-century American painters